Daiwal is a village, Union Council (administrative subdivision) number 08 of Khushab District in the Punjab Province of Pakistan. Daiwal, Mangwal and Jaswal are the main parts of this union. It is located at 32°31'60N 72°31'60E

Population 
ACCORDING TO THE 2010 THE POPULATION WAS 25000

2009     2450

References

Union councils of Khushab District
Populated places in Khushab District